The Northwest Open is golf tournament played in the Pacific Northwest, open to both amateur and professional golfers. It is organized by the Pacific Northwest section of the PGA of America. It has been played annually since 1905 at a variety of courses.

Winners

2022 Graham Moody (a)
2021 Max Sekulic (a)
2020 Nathan Cogswell (a)
2019 Derek Berg
2018 Shane Prante
2017 Shane Prante
2016 Brian Thornton
2015 Derek Barron
2014 Carl Jonson (a)
2013 Shane Prante
2012 Brandon Kearney
2011 Corey Prugh
2010 Brian Thornton
2009 Mike Schoner
2008 Rob Clark
2007 Jeff Coston
2006 Derek Berg (a)
2005 Derek Berg (a)
2004 Erik Hanson (a)
2003 Bob Conrad
2002 Michael Combs
2001 Jeff Coston
2000 Bill Porter
1999 Brent Murray
1998 Bill Porter
1997 Bill Porter
1996 Doug Hixson
1995 John McComish
1994 Rick Fehr
1993 Rick Acton
1992 David DeLong
1991 Steve Rintoul
1990 Fred Couples
1989 Brian Mogg
1988 Fred Couples
1987 Bob Gilder
1986 John DeLong
1985 Mike Gove
1984 Don Bies
1983 Randy Jensen
1982 Jeff Sanders
1981 Pat Fitzsimons
1980 Craig Griswold
1979 Dave Crowe
1978 Rick Acton
1977 Pat Fitzsimons
1976 John Fought
1975 Tim Berg
1974 Bill Wakeham
1973 Rick Acton
1972 Tim Berg
1971 Bob Ellsworth
1970 Jim McLean
1969 Pat Fitzsimons (a)
1968 Bob Duden
1967 Otto Hofmeister
1966 Al Mengert
1965 Jim Peterson
1964 Rod Funseth
1963 Bob Duden
1962 Don Bies
1961 Bud Ward
1960 Stan Leonard
1959 Bob Duden
1958 Don Taylor
1957 Al Feldman
1956 Ockie Eliason
1955 Ockie Eliason
1954 Eddie Draper
1953 Bruce Cudd
1952 Al Mengert
1951 Harold West
1950 Ray Honsberger
1949 Ed Oliver
1948 Bud Ward (a)
1947 Bud Ward (a)
1946 Bud Ward (a)
1943–45 No tournament
1942 Harry Givan
1941 Al Zimmerman
1940 Bud Ward (a)
1939 Bud Ward (a)
1938 Al Zimmerman
1937 Stan Leonard (a)
1936 Emery Zimmerman
1935 James Johnson
1934 Eddie Hogan
1933 Al Zimmerman
1932 Neil Christian
1931 Al Zimmerman
1930 Bert Wilde
1929 Neil Christian
1928 Oscar Willing (a)
1927 Walter Pursey
1926 John Junor
1925 Jack Hueston
1924 Neil Christian
1923 Phil Taylor
1922 Davie Black
1921 No tournament
1920 Davie Black
1919 Harold Samson
1918 George Turnbull
1917 Walter Fovargue
1916 Rudie Wilhelm
1915 William Leith
1914 George Turnbull
1913 Jim Barnes
1912 Jim Barnes
1911 Jim Barnes
1910 Robert Johnstone
1909 Jim Barnes
1908 Robert Johnstone
1907 Robert Johnstone
1906 Robert Johnstone
1905 George Smith

(a) denotes amateur
Source:

References

External links
PGA of America - Pacific Northwest section
List of winners

Golf in Oregon
Golf in Washington (state)
PGA of America sectional tournaments
Recurring sporting events established in 1905
1905 establishments in the United States